This is a list of electoral results for the Electoral district of Lowan in Victorian state elections.

Members for Lowan

Election results

Elections in the 2020s

Elections in the 2010s

Elections in the 2000s

Elections in the 1980s

The two party preferred vote was not counted between the National and Liberal candidates for Lowan.

The two candidate preferred vote was not counted between the National and Liberal candidates for Lowan.

Elections in the 1970s

Elections in the 1960s

 In the redistribution, Lowan became a notionally Country party held seat.

Elections in the 1950s

Elections in the 1940s

 Hamilton Lamb was a prisoner-of-war at this time and was not opposed. He died on the Burma Railway on 7 December 1943. Confirmation of his death was not received until September 1944.

 Two candidate preferred vote was estimated.

Elections in the 1930s

Elections in the 1920s

Elections in the 1910s

References

 

Victoria (Australia) state electoral results by district